Wrath is an American progressive thrash metal band founded in 1982.

Music style
The band plays progressive, technically demanding thrash metal which has been referred to as "Tech-Thrash" or "Speed-Tech" They have been compared to groups such as Watchtower, Mekong Delta, Coroner and Hexenhaus.

Members
Source:
Current lineup
 Gary Modica – Bass 
 Brian Cashmore – Guitars 
 Gary Golwitzer – Vocals 
 Jake Fromkin – Drums 
 Rob Noon – Guitars 

Past members
 Rick Rios – Drums 
 Chris Wisco – Guitars 
 John Duffy – Vocals 
 Mike Nyrkkanen – Guitars 
 Mike Fron – Drums 
 Dave Sollman – Drums 
 Kurt Grayson – Vocals 
 Scott Matrise – Vocals 
Patt Maxwell - Drums (2009-2016)
 Scott Nyquist – Guitars

Discography
 Children of the Wicked (Demo, 1985, Eigenveröffentlichung)
 Demo 85 (Demo, 1985, Self-released)
 Fit of Anger (Studio album, 1986, King Klassic Records)
 Nothing to Fear (Studio album, 1987, Medusa Records)
 Insane Society (Studio album, 1990, Medusa Records)
 Demo 92 (Demo, 1992, Self-released)
 Wrath E.P. (EP, 2008, Self-released)
 Stark Raving Mad (Studio album, 2014, Self-released)
 Rage (Studio album, 2018, Combat Records)

References 

American thrash metal musical groups
American progressive metal musical groups
Heavy metal musical groups from Illinois
Musical groups established in 1982
Musical groups from Chicago
1982 establishments in Illinois